The Centenary Gentlemen baseball team is a varsity intercollegiate athletic team of Centenary College of Louisiana in Shreveport, Louisiana, United States. The team is a member of the Southern Collegiate Athletic Conference (SCAC), which is part of the National Collegiate Athletic Association's Division III. Prior to 2011, Centenary was a member of the NCAA Division I, and competed in the Summit League. The Gentlemen are coached by Mike Diaz. In 2013, the Gents won the Southern Collegiate Athletic Conference regular season, the school's first regular season championship since 1988. The Gents repeated as SCAC regular season champions in 2015.

The team plays its home games in Shreveport at Shehee Stadium. The stadium, originally named Centenary Park, was completely renovated in 2000 under then Centenary baseball head coach Ed McCann and renamed Shehee Stadium.

Major League Baseball
Centenary has had 20 Major League Baseball draft selections since the draft began in 1965.

References

External links